The Cega is a river in the Iberian Peninsula a left-bank tributary of the Douro.

It is born out of the confluence of the Artiñuelo and the Vueltas creeks in the Sierra de Guadarrama. 133 km-long, the Cega, running northwest through the province of Segovia, empties in the Douro in the province of Valladolid, having previously received the waters of the Pirón, its main left-bank tributary.

References 

Tributaries of the Douro River
Rivers of Castile and León
Geography of the Province of Segovia
Rivers of Valladolid
Sierra de Guadarrama